Scott Jennings (born October 26, 1977) is an American writer and conservative commentator. He is an on-air contributor for CNN, and writes for CNN.com, USA Today, and the Los Angeles Times.

Jennings is a native of Dawson Springs, Kentucky and graduated from high school there in 1996. He was a Coca-Cola National Scholar and featured in their Foundation's magazine in 2006. He received his bachelor's degree from the University of Louisville in 2000 where he was a McConnell Scholar. While a student at the University of Louisville, Jennings was a news anchor and reporter for WHAS Radio. While at WHAS, Jennings won an award from the Associated Press for a series on the plight of the homeless living in downtown Louisville.

President Bush appointed Jennings to the position of special assistant to the president and deputy director of political affairs in February 2006. Jennings had previously served as executive director of the Bush-Cheney campaign in New Mexico in 2004, and as a staff member of the Bush-Cheney campaign in Kentucky in 2000.

Jennings is a founding partner of RunSwitch Public Relations, Kentucky's largest public relations and public affairs firm since 2013. He has been writing a regular column for the Louisville Courier-Journal since 2013, and was signed as an on-air contributor by CNN in 2017. He is routinely cited as an adviser to Senate Majority Leader Mitch McConnell in news publications, and was part of McConnell's campaigns for the U.S. Senate in 2002, 2008, and 2014. He joined the LA Times as a columnist in 2019.

Jennings is on the speaking circuit, briefing groups on the political landscape and taking part in panel discussions. He was a Resident Fellow at Harvard's Institute of Politics in 2018, and became an Adjunct Lecturer in the Harvard Kennedy School of Government in 2019. He is also heard frequently on NPR's Morning Edition as a conservative political analyst.

Personal
Jennings is married to Autumn Stiff Jennings, of Whitesville, Kentucky. They have four children, and live in Prospect, Kentucky.

Career
Jennings served as political director for President Bush's 2000 Kentucky campaign, Sen. Mitch McConnell (R-Ky.) in his 2002 re-election campaign, Gov. Ernie Fletcher in his 2003 campaign, and managed President Bush's campaign in New Mexico in 2004, before joining the White House. New Mexico was one of only two states to flip from blue to red in between 2000 and 2004; the other was Iowa. He served as associate director in the Office of Political Affairs at the White House before being named special assistant to the president in October 2005.

After leaving the White House, Scott Jennings became Director of Strategic Development and Senior Strategist for Peritus Public Relations in Louisville, KY, before co-founding RunSwitch PR in Louisville in 2012.  Jennings is frequently quoted by media outlets as a political analyst. During the 2016 presidential election, he appeared frequently on the Fox News Channel and other outlets as a commentator discussing polling and the political news of the day.

In 2017, Jennings joined CNN as an on-air contributor. He has made hundreds of appearances on the network on AC360 with Anderson Cooper, The Lead with Jake Tapper, CNN Tonight with Don Lemon and other programs.

Bush 2004 Campaign in New Mexico
After losing New Mexico to Al Gore in 2000 by just 366 votes, President Bush's reelection campaign dispatched Jennings to manage its operations there. Jennings arrived in early 2004 to find a divided state Republican Party. Shortly after his arrival, the state party chairman, State Senator Ramsay Gorham, resigned both her chairmanship and legislative seat and moved out of the state.  Jennings and Republican Party counterpart Jay McCleskey set about repairing the damaged party, recruiting 15,000 volunteers to execute a grassroots strategy that relied heavily on peer-to-peer, coalition-based activity.  The Democratic establishment spent millions of dollars in the state through the Kerry for President Campaign, the state Democratic Party, and through a host of third-party organizations such as American Coming Together and Moveon.org.  Bush won the New Mexico election by 5,988 votes, making it one of the closest states in the nation. Along with only Iowa, New Mexico flipped from Democrat to Republican between 2000 and 2004.

Political Operations in Kentucky
Between 2000 and 2003, Jennings directed the political operations for George W. Bush's presidential campaign, Senator Mitch McConnell's reelection campaign, and Ernie Fletcher's gubernatorial campaign. Bush defeated Al Gore in Kentucky, a state Bill Clinton won twice, with 56.5%, McConnell set a record by scoring 65 percent in his campaign, and Fletcher became the first Republican governor in Kentucky in over 30 years by winning 55 percent of the vote. Jennings resumed his work in Kentucky in 2008, helping U.S. Senator Mitch McConnell, Congressman Brett Guthrie, and state legislative Republicans win their races.

In 2019, Jennings made television and radio ads for Attorney General Daniel Cameron, the first stand-alone African-American candidate to win statewide office in Kentucky.

GSA Hatch Act Inquiry
In 2007, Jennings was mentioned in an inquiry into the politicization of the General Services Administration (GSA).  At a Congressional hearing, witnesses testified that on January 26, 2007, Jennings was present at a meeting where GSA Administrator Lurita Doan "joined in a video conference earlier this year with top GSA political appointees, who discussed ways to help Republican candidates."  On April 23, 2007, the U.S. Office of Special Counsel (OSC) announced it was investigating the January video conference, to look at whether the political dealings of the White House had violated the Hatch Act.

While the OSC found that Doan violated the Hatch Act, Elaine Kaplan, Special Counsel during the Clinton Administration, said that "nothing in the OSC's investigative report suggests that anything improper had occurred before Doan initiated the discussion." Jennings' presentation was similar in nature to several others disclosed by the White House. Special Counsel Scott Bloch told the Washington Post, "Political forecasts, just generally . . . I do not regard as illegal political activity."  White House Deputy Press Secretary Dana Perino described the briefings to reporters: "It's not unlawful and it wasn't unusual for informational briefings to be given. There is no prohibition under the Hatch Act of allowing political appointees to talk to other political appointees about the political landscape in which they are trying to advance the president's agenda."

Dismissal of United States Attorneys Controversy

Jennings was involved in the dismissal of U.S. attorneys controversy in early 2007 testifying on August 2, 2007, before the Judiciary Committee. He invoked executive privilege and refused to answer most questions, claiming the president George W. Bush had ordered his non-compliance. Democrats on the committee contested the legitimacy of the privilege assertion, Patrick Leahy calling it, "...a bogus claim." E-mails published subsequently confirmed that Jennings was directly involved in the firing of New Mexico US Attorney David Iglesias, Jennings writing in one e-mail to a White House staffer, "Iglesias has done nothing," and to another, "We are getting killed out there," adding that the White House "move forward with getting rid of the NM USATTY."

White House and RNC Email Accounts

In the months leading up to the  controversy around dismissal of United States attorneys, Jennings communicated with Justice Department officials "concerning the appointment of Tim Griffin, a former Karl Rove aide, as U.S. attorney in Little Rock, according to e-mails released [in March, 2007]. For that exchange, Jennings, although working at the White House, used an e-mail account registered to the Republican National Committee (RNC), where Griffin had worked as a political opposition researcher."

Involvement in 2014 U.S. Senate Election in Kentucky
Jennings ran a super PAC known as Kentuckians for Strong Leadership that supported the re-election of Mitch McConnell during the 2014 U.S. Senate election in Kentucky. In July 2014, Jennings told WFPL "I think the party is coming together just fine and I don't detect any problems for McConnell on GOP unity."

During the race, Jennings was profiled in The New Yorker magazine, which dubbed him "the master of attack." After the race, Kentucky political news show "Pure Politics" interviewed Jennings and said that he had "shaped the race in McConnell's favor."

Involvement in 2016 Kentucky State Legislative Races 
In 2016, Jennings' super PAC, Kentuckians for Strong Leadership (KSL), sought to help Republicans gain control of the Kentucky state House of Representatives. KSL spent $2 million on 19 legislative races as the GOP went from a 53-47 minority to a 64-36 super majority. "Pure Politics" credited KSL with helping the GOP achieve its objective. The group created a stir in the closing days of the campaign by sending thousands of Hillary Clinton birthday cards to voters across the state, asking them to "ruin Hillary's birthday" by voting against Clinton and "every Clinton Democrat running."

Columnist for Louisville Courier-Journal and Gannet 
Jennings became a contributing columnist to the Louisville Courier-Journal in 2013, writing a conservative column that appears every other Wednesday. Jennings's columns are frequently picked up by Gannett's flagship USA TODAY. In Jennings' columns for the Louisville newspaper, he tackles policy and political issues affecting Kentucky and the nation. In 2018 and 2021, Jennings won a Society of Professional Journalists award for his Courier-Journal writing. Jennings' writing also appears occasionally on RealClearPolitics.

CNN 
In June 2017, Jennings joined CNN as a political contributor, along with former Clinton campaign manager Robby Mook, former Kasich chief strategist John Weaver, former Virginia attorney general Ken Cuccinelli, Obama national security alum Shawn Turner and Yale Law School associate dean and former FBI special agent Asha Rangappa.

Around that, it was reported in various news outlets that he had been offered, but turned down, a senior role in the Trump White House.

Harvard's Institute of Politics and Kennedy School of Government 
Jennings was named a resident fellow at the Harvard Institute of Politics in the Kennedy School of Government for the Spring 2018 semester. He taught a series of seminars on tribalism in American politics, and attracted such guest lecturers to his class as Senate Majority Leader Mitch McConnell and former White House Chief of Staff and RNC Chairman Reince Priebus.

In 2019, Jennings returned to Harvard's Kennedy School to serve as an Adjunct Lecturer in Public Policy, teaching a course on modern American political campaigns.

Los Angeles Times 
Jennings was named an LA Times contributing columnist in the Fall of 2019. His first column for the paper was called "Attitude and Gratitude: Why Republicans Stick with Trump." He also wrote a column heralding Tiger Woods' 2019 Master's win.

References

External links
 Biography of Jennings at the website for The Washington Center for Internships and Academic Seminars
 Jennings biography on the RunSwitch Public Relations website

1977 births
Assistants to the President of the United States
CNN people
Dismissal of U.S. attorneys controversy
George W. Bush administration personnel
Kentucky Republicans
Living people
People from Dawson Springs, Kentucky
University of Louisville alumni